Ashley Cain may refer to:

 Ashley Cain (figure skater) (born 1995), American figure skater
 Ashley Cain (footballer) (born 1990), English footballer